WASP-62 is a single star about 575 light-years away. It is an F class main-sequence star, orbited by a planet, WASP-62b. The age of WASP-62 is much younger than the Sun at 0.8 billion years, and it has a metal abundance similar to the Sun.  WASP-62 was named "Naledi" in 2019.

Planetary system
A transiting hot Jupiter exoplanet orbiting WASP-62 was discovered by WASP in 2012. The planet's equilibrium temperature is 1440 K, but the measured average temperature is colder at 1329.6 K. In 2020, a transmission spectrum indicated the atmosphere of WASP-62b is free of clouds. It contains sodium and possibly silicon hydrides.

The planetary orbit is slightly misaligned to the equatorial plane of the star, with the misalignment angle equal to 19.4°.

WASP-62b was named "Krotoa" in 2019 by amateur astronomers from South Africa as part of the NameExoWorlds contest.

References

F-type main-sequence stars
Planetary systems with one confirmed planet
Planetary transit variables
Dorado (constellation)
J05483359-6359183
Durchmusterung objects